This article refers to the building, for the diplomatic mission, see Embassy of Jamaica in Washington, D.C.
1520 New Hampshire Avenue, NW is located in the Dupont Circle neighbourhood of Washington, D.C. It has had a number of notable owners, and is currently home to the Embassy of Jamaica to the United States of America.

Architecture
The building, an example of Beaux-Arts architecture, is a contributing property to the Dupont Circle Historic District and valued at $4,422,000. Beaux-Arts is a neoclassical architectural style that was taught at the École des Beaux-Arts in Paris.

Ownership
Notable owners of the property have included Beekman Winthrop, George P. McLean, author Thomas Bell Sweeney, the Institute for Policy Studies, and the Children's Defense Fund.

References

Beaux-Arts architecture in Washington, D.C.
Dupont Circle